The 2005 Virginia Tech Hokies football team represented Virginia Polytechnic Institute and State University during the 2005 NCAA Division I-A football season. The team's head coach was Frank Beamer.

Virginia Tech began the season ranked #7 in the USA Today Coaches Poll and #8 in the Associated Press Poll after going 10-3 (7-1 ACC) in 2004 and winning the Atlantic Coast Conference title.

The 2005 Hokies compiled an 11-2 overall record, including a 7-1 mark during the regular season in Atlantic Coast Conference. The lone regular season conference loss came at home in a 27-7 loss to Miami. Miami was upset late in the season by Georgia Tech, in a game that had previously been postponed due to Hurricane Wilma and so Virginia Tech won the Coastal Division of the ACC outright.

Following the regular season, the Hokies faced Atlantic Division champion Florida State in the ACC football championship game.  After a defensive struggle in the first half and a 3-3 halftime tie, Florida State broke the game open in the third quarter, piling up 24 unanswered points. A fourth quarter Tech rally fell short and the Hokies lost 27-22.

The Hokies concluded the season at the 2006 Gator Bowl against Louisville, scoring 22 unanswered fourth quarter points to defeat the #16 Cardinals 35-24.

ESPN's College GameDay visited Blacksburg twice during the season – for the Georgia Tech game on September 24, after Hurricane Rita forced the program to move from Baton Rouge, and for the Miami game on November 5.

Tech's defense began the season with question marks in the secondary, having lost three starters and one key backup to graduation. Depth became a critical issue when two backup cornerbacks were arrested in the spring   Despite the question marks, Tech finished third nationally in pass defense (154.23 yards per game) and first nationally in total defense (247.62 yards per game).

Schedule

Personnel

Coaching staff

Roster

Marcus Vick

With the departure of three-year starting quarterback Bryan Randall, the Hokies found themselves with questions at the quarterback position.  Marcus Vick, who had seen limited action in 2003, before being suspended for the 2004 season for off-field transgressions, entered spring practice as the #3 quarterback on the depth chart behind Sean Glennon and Cory Holt.

In the spring game, Vick completed 9 of his 17 passes for 107 yards and he was named the starter the next day.

After a rough first start against NC State, in which the offense managed just 232 yards, Vick showed improved poise and numbers through the next several games.

During the West Virginia game, Vick made an obscene gesture towards the Mountaineer fans who had been chanting "rapist" and "child molester" at him.  He later apologized for his conduct.  Despite the incident, Vick was a near-perfect 15 of 17 passing against the Mountaineers and added 74 yards on the ground, including a 23-yard scramble as part of a fourth-quarter touchdown drive that would put the game out of reach.

Against Miami, Vick had the worst game of his career, turning the ball over six times and managing only one first half completion.

Following the loss to Florida State in the ACC championship game, the Hokies earned a trip to the Gator Bowl to face Louisville.  During the second quarter of the game, as players were returning to the huddle after a play, Vick stomped on the left calf of Louisville defensive end Elvis Dumervil.  He later claimed that the stomp was accidental, though replays show Vick appearing to deliberately aim for the leg.  Vick stated that he apologized to Dumervil after the game, though Dumervil denied that any apology had been offered.

Steve Usecheck, the Big 12 Conference referee who headed the Gator Bowl officiating crew, stated that the officiating crew missed the stomp and would have ejected Vick if it had been seen.

The following week, it was revealed that Vick had been cited for speeding and driving with a suspended license.  University President Charles Steger decided to dismiss Vick from the team and Vick then decided to declare for the NFL draft.

Game summaries

NC State

The eighth highest-rated broadcast in the history of ESPN2, this game set a new record for the most-watched college football game in the history of ESPN2.  (That mark was eclipsed later that month by a Monday-night broadcast of Tennessee @ LSU.)  Marcus Vick made his first start for the Hokies, completing 10 of 21 passes for 108 yards.  Tech's offense managed only 232 yards of total offense (State piled up 438), but Nic Schmitt, in his debut game as starting punter, kept the Hokies in good field position, averaging 46.5 yards per punt. Special teams, penalties (the Wolfpack were penalized 12 times for 105 yards), and turnovers (State committed three turnovers while Tech committed none) were the difference in the game.

Leading 13-10 at halftime, the Wolfpack drove into Tech territory on their first possession of the second half, then pinned the Hokies at the 1-yard-line.  With third down and 3 yards to go from his own 8, Vick threw an incomplete pass and the Hokies would have had to punt, but an NC State personal foul allowed the drive to continue.  The Hokies went on to march 88 yards down the field, eating up the bulk of the time remaining in the third quarter, and capped the drive with a field goal from Brandon Pace.

In the fourth quarter, after a 21-yard punt return by Eddie Royal, Tech found itself starting at the NC State 20 and Marcus Vick hit David Clowney for the winning touchdown.

Duke

In their second straight game in the Triangle, Hokie fans packed Wallace Wade Stadium and accounted for at least two-thirds of the 25,014-strong crowd.

The Hokies had little trouble defeating the Blue Devils, holding Duke to 35 yards of total offense – the fewest yards they have allowed in any game since before 1950.  Duke managed over five yards on only two drives and their deepest penetration was to Virginia Tech's 48-yard line, whereas the Hokies started all but three drives at their own 43 or better.

Marcus Vick threw for 172 yards and three touchdowns, going 12-of-19 (three of his incomplete passes were dropped by receivers).  Brandon Ore, who would become the Hokies' featured tailback in 2006, made his debut, rushing for 51 yards and one touchdown.

Ohio

In the Hokies' home opener and the inaugural game for the Lane Stadium expansion, the Hokie defense turned in its second straight shutout.  Ohio's defense, which had scored two touchdowns the previous week in an upset win over Pitt, stifled the Hokies early, allowing only 158 first half yards and twice forcing three-and-out drives.

In their only scoring threat of the first half, Ohio penetrated deep into Tech territory, but the drive stalled at the 20 and kicker Jonathon Greene missed a field goal. The Hokies scored two touchdowns off of turnovers and took a 17-point lead into the locker room at halftime.

In the second half, the Hokies scored touchdowns on four of their first five possessions, with drives of 65, 80, 56, and 97.

Georgia Tech

On a day when ESPN's College GameDay visited Blacksburg, the Hokies dominated Georgia Tech in every phase of the game.  The Hokies scored three non-offensive touchdowns, including D.J. Parker's return of a blocked field goal.  The Hokies' kicking game kept Georgia Tech bottled up with Nic Schmitt averaging 49.2 yards per punt – including a 61-yarder that was downed at the one-yard-line – and with Jared Develli kicking touchbacks on four of his eight kickoffs.

Georgia Tech quarterback Reggie Ball, who had missed the previous week's game against Connecticut due to viral meningitis was not 100%.  Ball completed only 11 of his 27 passes and threw two touchdowns.  The lone score for the Yellow Jackets came on a third quarter 11-yard touchdown pass from Ball to Calvin Johnson.

West Virginia

The 2005 meeting between West Virginia and Virginia Tech was the final scheduled meeting between two teams that had met annually since 1973.  Since 1997, the two teams had competed for the Black Diamond Trophy.

Hokie quarterback Marcus Vick put on one of his best performances of the season against the Mountaineers – a near-perfect 15 of 17 passing against the Mountaineers.  Vick added 74 yards on the ground, including a 23-yard scramble as part of a fourth-quarter touchdown drive that would put the game out of reach.  The Hokies held onto the ball, committing no turnovers to WVU's two, and ran 70 plays compared with only 48 for the Mountaineers.  Tech's defense held serve, holding West Virginia without a first down on their first three possessions.

After West Virginia starting quarterback was knocked out of the game, backup Pat White came in and threw two second-quarter touchdown passes, including a 46-yarder to Dorrell Jalloh to cut the Hokies' lead to three points, but the Mountaineers' only score after that point was a field goal and Tech would go on to win 34-17.

Marshall

Maryland

Boston College

Miami

Virginia

North Carolina

Florida State

Louisville

The 2006 Gator Bowl was played on January 2, 2006 at 12:30 p.m. EST in Jacksonville, Florida. Louisville led for much of the game, beginning with an 11-yard touchdown pass in the first quarter by backup quarterback Hunter Cantwell, who filled in for the injured Brohm. Tech was only able to answer with a field goal, and Louisville was able to add another touchdown before the end of the quarter. In the second quarter, Virginia Tech fought back and narrowed Louisville's lead to a single touchdown. At halftime, the score was 17–10 in Louisville's favor. In the second half, Virginia Tech's offense began to have success. Tech earned the only points of the third quarter—a 28-yard field goal from kicker Brandon Pace—to narrow Louisville's lead to 17–13. In the fourth quarter, however, the game fully turned in the Hokies' favor. Though Louisville scored a touchdown early in the quarter, Virginia Tech scored 22 unanswered points in the final 13 minutes of the game to take a 35–24 lead and earn the win.

Rankings

References

Virginia Tech
Virginia Tech Hokies football seasons
Gator Bowl champion seasons
Virginia Tech Hokies football